Vanya Melissa Thais Iriarte is a conservative Peruvian political commentator. She gained prominence in Peruvian media for her strong opposition to Pedro Castillo during the 2021 Peruvian general election and her frequent controversial statements in the press.

Career 
Thais graduated with a degree in journalism from the University of San Martín de Porres. Following her graduation from University of San Martín de Porres, Thais gained prominence after appearing as a panelist on the program of Beto Ortiz for the conservative Willax Televisión channel. Following the election of Pedro Castillo in the 2021 Peruvian general election, Thais defended the possible need for a coup d'état to oust Castillo from office, sharing these thoughts with Alejandro Cavero of the conservative Go on Country according to Ojo Público. In anti-Castillo demonstrations organized by Fujimorists, Thais was presented on the main stage to speak beside Keiko Fujimori, the daughter of the convicted former president of Peru, Alberto Fujimori, who lost to Castillo in the 2021 presidential elections.

In late-2021,Thais was approached by the "Brotherhood of Pisco" according to El Foco, a group of businessmen, politicians and individuals of the Union of Multimodal Transport Guilds of Peru (UGTRANM) and the  who planned to support a transportation strike to destabilized the government of Pedro Castillo. The group planned to fund Thais' media endeavors, though she denied receiving funds from the group. Thais travelled to Spain in October 2021 to participate in what La Jornada described as an "indoctrination program" hosted by the Disenso Foundation of the far-right Spanish party Vox. Thais would also sign the Madrid Charter, a document drafted by Vox that describes left-wing groups as enemies of Ibero-America involved in a "criminal project" that are "under the umbrella of the Cuban regime".

As a collaborator with the YouTube channel Quinto Poder, Thais works with Jorge Ugarte Olivera, a former author of fiction novels. She is also the creator of the media initiative "Proyecto Libertad".

Political views 
Peruvian media have variably described Thais as having right-wing to far-right views and being a Fujimorist, though Thais denies the latter. According to OjoPúblico, Thais has been known to "promote virulent speeches and disinformation on social networks", with the website writing that she described rights for both minorities and LGBT individuals as "stupid". Diario Correo described Thais as anti-feminist after she stated "Feminism gives me nausea and it will always give me nausea, ...  I believe in the Christian submission of the woman to her husband". She has also defended Alberto Fujimori for his use of Grupo Colina, a death squad that he controlled. Thias has also shared support for President of Brazil Jair Bolsonaro on social media.

Personal life 
Thais has described herself as a Catholic. She also has publicly shared that she was once engaged in a Lesbian relationship, saying she had just "got out of a super toxic relationship" and that she later asked "for forgiveness for having lived in sin" once she returned to attending church.

References 

Living people
Peruvian anti-communists
Peruvian people of Basque descent
Peruvian people of Spanish descent
Hispanists
Peruvian Roman Catholics
Signers of the Madrid Charter
University of San Martín de Porres alumni
1995 births
Political commentators